The Wanji are an ethnic and linguistic group native to Makete District, in the Kipengere Mountains of Njombe Region  and also native to Mbeya Region in southern Tanzania.  In 2003 the Wanji population was estimated to number 28,000. wanji language is the composition of nearby languages like Sangu, Kinga, Nyakyusa, Safwa and Bena .

Ethnic groups in Tanzania